The Basilica di San Lorenzo may refer to one of the following churches:

Germany 
 St. Lorenz Basilica, Kempten, Bavaria

Italy 
 Basilica di San Lorenzo di Firenze, Florence
 Basilica of San Lorenzo, Milan
 Basilica of Saint Lawrence outside the Walls (Basilica Papale di San Lorenzo fuori le Mura), Rome

See also
 Basilica of St. Lawrence (disambiguation)
 San Lorenzo (disambiguation)